Gerson Camata (June 29, 1941 – December 26, 2018) was a Brazilian journalist and politician. Camata served in Federal Senate for three terms from 1987 until 2011. He was also the first person directly elected Governor of Espírito Santo, an office he held from 1983 to 1986, following the restoration of democracy in the 1980s.

On December 26, 2018, Camata was shot and killed outside a restaurant in the upscale  neighborhood of Vitória, Espírito Santo by his former aide.

Biography
Camata graduated from Federal University of Espírito Santo with a degree in economics. He worked as a journalist and host for Radio Espírito Santo, where he covered crime and the police.

In 1967, Camata began his political career as a Vitória city alderman for the National Renewal Alliance (ARENA), the party of the military dictatorship that ruled Brazil at the time. He served on the city counil from 1967 until 1970, when he was elected to the Legislative Assembly of Espírito Santo as an ARENA state deputy.

In 1974, Camata was elected to the federal Chamber of Deputies as a member of ARENA. He won re-election to a second term in the Chamber of Deputies in 1978. In 1979, with the legalization of opposition parties, Camata lefr ARENA and joined the newly formed Brazilian Democratic Movement Party (PMDB) in opposition to the government.

In 1982, Camata announced his candidacy for Governor of Espírito Santo. He won the 1982 Espírito Santo gubernatorial election with 67% of the vote, becoming the first person directly elected as Espírito Santo's governor during the transition to democracy. He served as governor from 1983 until 1986, when he resigned to run for the Federal Senate.  His vice governor, succeeded Camata as the new governor of Espírito Santo.

Camata was elected to his first term in the Federal Senate in the 1986 Brazilian legislative election. He won re-election to Senate in the 1994 and 2002 legislative elections. Camata served the Senate for twenty-four years (and three full terms) until his retirement in 2011.  During his final term, Camata simultaneously served as the state Secretary of Development, Infrastructure and Transport under Governor Paulo Hartung, beginning in May 2006.

Assassination
On December 26, 2018, Camata was shot and killed by a former aide in the  neighborhood of Vitória, Espírito Santo. The shooting occurred outside a restaurant near the intersection of Chapot Presvot and Joaquim Lyrio streets. Camata was shot in the left shoulder. The bullet exited through his right shoulder, causing damage to his internal organs. He did not survive the attack and died at the age of 77.

Police captured the assailant, Marcos Vinícius Moreira Andrade, a former aide to Camata, just minutes after the attack.

Camata, a resident of the Ilha do Frade neighborhood of Vitória, was survived by his wife, Rita Camata, a former state and federal deputy, and their two children, Bruno and Enza Rafaela. Espírito Santo Governor Paulo Hartung declared seven days of mourning following Camata's murder.

References

1941 births
2018 deaths
People from Castelo, Espírito Santo
Brazilian people of Italian descent
National Renewal Alliance politicians
Brazilian Democratic Movement politicians
Brazilian Social Democracy Party politicians
Members of the Chamber of Deputies (Brazil) from Espírito Santo
Members of the Federal Senate (Brazil)
Governors of Espírito Santo
Members of the Legislative Assembly of Espírito Santo
Assassinated Brazilian politicians
Brazilian radio journalists
Spouses of Brazilian politicians